Deirdre Mullins is an Irish actress, director and activist. In 2017, she won a Scottish BAFTA for Best Actress in Film for her role in The Dark Mile.

Early life and education
Born in Dublin, Mullins grew up in Stoneybatter on the city's Northside. Her family moved to the suburb Howth when she was 10. She was head girl at Mount Temple Comprehensive School in Clontarf. She began her studies in Drama and Theatre at Trinity College Dublin. She then transferred to the University of St Andrews where she studied Anthropology and later graduated with a degree in English Literature in 2006. She participated in the Trinity Players and the St Andrews Mermaids. She went on to train at the Bristol Old Vic Theatre School from 2006 to 2008 before moving to London.

Career
Mullins starred as Naomi in the Channel 4 series Man Down.  Her theatre work includes playing Rosalind in As You Like It at Shakespeare's Globe, Lika in Marina Carr's 16 Possible Glimpses at the Abbey Theatre, and Jessie Taite in Seán O'Casey's The Silver Tassie at the National Theatre.

Mullins' directing debut, a production of Mary Zimmerman's Metamorphoses, was set in a hotel swimming pool and won her rave reviews at the Edinburgh Fringe 2006 including The Scotsmans top 5 shows to see at the Fringe. It was in Time Outs top 3 shows at the Fringe; giving it 5 stars, Rachel Halliburton said 'This is the kind of unexpected discovery that critics live for at Edinburgh'. A decade later, Mullins directed her second show, an experimental new play by Bea Roberts, Infinity Pool, which won a Toast of the Fringe Award at Plymouth Fringe Festival and went on to enjoy a place on The Guardians list of recommended shows at the Edinburgh Fringe & International Festival 2016. The critic Lyn Gardner described it as 'painfully funny'. Giving it 5 stars from The Stage, Stewart Pringle said it was 'utterly unique and exceptional in every way, it's a heart-breaking story of a stunted life, told with theatrical verve and palpable compassion'. The play was short-listed for the highly prestigious Total Theatre Award.

Mullins is a core committee member of ERA 50:50, a campaign calling for equal representation of women on screen and stage. She made an impassioned speech about this when picking up her BAFTA (Scotland).

Filmography

Film

Television

Video games

Stage

Audio

Radio

Drama

References

External links 
 

Living people
21st-century Irish actresses
Actresses from Dublin (city)
Alumni of Bristol Old Vic Theatre School
Alumni of the University of St Andrews
Irish expatriates in the United Kingdom
Irish film actresses
Irish stage actresses
Irish television actresses
Irish voice actresses
People educated at Mount Temple Comprehensive School
People from Howth
People from Northside, Dublin
Year of birth missing (living people)